This is a list of articles covering alternative medicine topics.

A

 Activated charcoal cleanse
 Acupressure
 Acupuncture
 Affirmative prayer
 Alexander technique
 Alternative cancer treatments
 Animal-assisted therapy
 Anthroposophical medicine
 Apitherapy
 Applied kinesiology
 Aquatherapy
 Aromatherapy
 Art therapy
 Asahi Health
 Astrology
 Attachment therapy
 Auriculotherapy
 Autogenic training
 Autosuggestion
 Ayurveda

B

 Bach flower therapy
 Balneotherapy
 Bates method
 Bibliotherapy
 Biodanza
 Bioresonance therapy
 Blood irradiation therapies
 Body-based manipulative therapies
 Body work (alternative medicine) or Massage therapy

C

 Chelation therapy
 Chinese food therapy
 Chinese herbology
 Chinese martial arts
 Chinese medicine
 Chinese pulse diagnosis
 Chakra
 Chiropractic
 Chromotherapy (color therapy, colorpuncture)
 Cinema therapy
 Coding (therapy)
 Coin rubbing
 Colloidal silver therapy
 Colon cleansing
 Colon hydrotherapy (Enema)
 Craniosacral therapy
 Creative visualization
 Crystal healing
 Cupping

D

 Dance therapy
 Detoxification
 Detoxification foot baths
 Dietary supplements
 Dowsing

E

 Ear candling
 Eclectic medicine
 Electromagnetic therapy
 Electrohomeopathy
 Equine-assisted therapy
 Energy medicine
 Earthing
 Magnet therapy
 Reiki
 Qigong
 Shiatsu
 Therapeutic touch
 Energy psychology

F

 Faith healing
 Fasting
 Feldenkrais Method
 Feng shui
 Five elements
 Flower essence therapy
 Functional medicine

G
 German New Medicine
 Grahamism
 Grinberg Method
 Gua sha
 Graphology

H

 Hair analysis (alternative medicine)
 Hatha yoga
 Havening
 Hawaiian massage
 Herbalism
 Herbal therapy
 Herbology
 Hijama
 Holistic living
 Holistic medicine
 Homeopathy
 Home remedies
 Hydrotherapy
 Hypnosis
 Hypnotherapy

I

 Introspection rundown
 Iridology
Isolation tank
 Isopathy

J
 Jilly Juice

L
 Laughter therapy
 Light therapy

M

 Macrobiotic lifestyle
 Magnetic healing
 Manipulative therapy
 Manual lymphatic drainage
 Martial arts
 Massage therapy
 Massage
 Medical intuition
 Meditation
 Mindfulness meditation
 Transcendental meditation
 Vipassana
 Meridian (Chinese medicine)
 Mega-vitamin therapy
 Mind–body intervention
Alexander technique
Aromatherapy
Autogenic training
Autosuggestion
Bach flower therapy
Feldenkrais method
Hatha yoga
Hypnotherapy
 Moxibustion
Myofascial release

N

 Naprapathy
 Natural Health
 Natural therapies
 Nature therapy
 Naturopathic medicine
 New thought
 Neuro-linguistic programming
 Nutritional healing
 Nutritional supplements
 Numerology

O

Orthopathy
Osteopathy

P

 Pilates
 Postural Integration
 Pranic healing
 Prayer
 Psychic surgery
 Prokarin

Q
 Qi
 Qigong
Quantum healing

R

 Radionics
 Rebirthing
 Recreational Therapy
 Reflexology
 Reiki
 Rolfing Structural Integration
 Rosen Method

S

Salt Therapy
 Self-hypnosis
 Shiatsu
 Siddha medicine
 Sonopuncture
 Sound therapy
 Spiritual mind treatment
 Structural Integration
 Support groups

T

 T'ai chi ch'uan
 Tantra massage
 Tao yin
 Thai massage
 Thalassotherapy
 Therapeutic horseback riding
 Therapeutic touch
 Tibetan eye chart
 Traditional Chinese medicine
 History of traditional Chinese medicine
 Traditional Korean medicine
 Traditional Japanese medicine
 Traditional Mongolian medicine
 Traditional Tibetan medicine
 Trager approach
 Transcendental meditation
 Trigger point
 Tui na

U

 Unani medicine
 Urine therapy
 Uropathy

V
 Vaginal steaming
 Vegetotherapy
 Visualization (cam)
 Visualization

W

 Water cure (therapy)
 Wellness (alternative medicine)
 Wuxing (Chinese philosophy)

Y

 Yoga
 Ashtanga yoga
 Ashtanga vinyasa yoga
 Bikram yoga
 Hatha yoga
 Iyengar yoga
 Kundalini yoga
 Siddha yoga
 Sivananda yoga
 Tantric yoga
 Viniyoga
 Vinyasa yoga
 Yoga Therapy
 Daoyin Taoist Yoga

Z
 Zang fu